Nicolás Yunes (born July 17, 1980) is an Argentinian theoretical physicist who is a professor at the University of Illinois Urbana-Champaign and the founding director of the Illinois Center for Advanced Studies of the Universe (ICASU). He is particularly interested in extreme gravity, gravitational waves, and compact binaries.

Early life and education 
Yunes was born in Buenos Aires, Argentina. He was an undergraduate student at Washington University in St. Louis, where he studied physics and graduated in 2003. Yunes moved to Pennsylvania State University for graduate studies, where he proposed gravitational waves a way to test for quantum gravity inspired features in the gravitational waves emitted by compact binaries. During his doctoral research he worked as a science monitor at the LIGO Hanford Observatory. From 2008 to 2010, he worked as a research associate at Princeton University. In 2010, Yunes joined Massachusetts Institute of Technology as an Einstein Fellow.

Research and career 
In 2011, Yunes joined the faculty at Montana State University as an assistant professor. After being promoted to an associate professor in 2016 he stayed at Montana State University until 2019 and co-founded the eXtreme Gravity Institute, XGI, at Montana State University. He was made a professor at the University of Illinois Urbana-Champaign in 2019. Yunes studies general relativity and gravitation. He was one of the creators of the parametrized post-Einsteinian framework, a proposed formalism to test Einstein's theory of general relativity with gravitational waves.

Yunes extracted astrophysical information from the Neutron Star Interior Composition Explorer (NICER), a NASA payload that was installed in the International Space Station, in 2017. The instrument can perform high precision measurements of neutron stars. By combining the X-ray data from NICER with gravitational wave information from advanced LIGO, Yunes is able to test nuclear physics and general relativity.

Yunes worked on the European Space Agency Laser Interferometer Space Antenna (LISA). He is particularly interested in how effectively LISA can test general relativity with gravitational waves emitted by compact binaries. One such system is extreme mass ratio inspirals (EMRIs), in which a small black hole orbits around a much heavier one, and gradually spirals in due to the emission of gravitational waves. These investigations can test whether Einstein was correct about the behaviour of gravity in extreme environments.

In 2020, Yunes and Clifford M. Will wrote a popular science book about gravitational waves and testing Einstein's theories of gravity. In 2022, Yunes and M. Coleman Miller wrote a physics textbook on gravitational waves with applications to nuclear physics, cosmology, astrophysics, and tests of general relativity.

Awards and honors 
 2008 Pennsylvania State University Alumni Dissertation Award
 2009 International Society on General Relativity and Gravitation The Jürgen Ehlers Thesis Prize
 2010 NASA Einstein Fellowship
 2013 Montana State University College of Letters and Science Fellow in Engagement
 2013 National Science Foundation CAREER Award
 2015 General Relativity and Gravitation Young Scientist Prize
 2017 Fox Faculty Award for Outstanding Research
 2022 Fellow of the American Physical Society

Selected publications

Personal life 
Yunes was married in 2008 and has one daughter, born in 2014 . Yunes is the son of Zoila Lorenzo and Dr. Roberto A. Yunes, the former director of the Hospital Tobar García.

References 

1980 births
Living people
Montana State University faculty
Pennsylvania State University alumni
People from Buenos Aires
University of Illinois Urbana-Champaign faculty
Washington University in St. Louis alumni
Fellows of the American Physical Society